NGC 7759 is a lenticular galaxy in the constellation Aquarius. It is located about 340 million light-years (100 Megaparsecs) away from the Sun. It was discovered independently by American astronomers Lewis A. Swift and Francis Preserved Leavenworth.

References

Aquarius (constellation)
7759
Lenticular galaxies